Jan Brink (born 1960) is a Swedish equestrian. He was born in Hörby. He competed at the 2008 Summer Olympics in Beijing, where he placed fourth in team dressage. He also competed at the 2000 and 2004 Summer Olympics.

Jan Brink is a seven-time Swedish dressage champion who rides the number one horse Björsell's Briar, winner of the Aachen Championships in 2005, and Bronze medallist at the 2005 European Dressage Championships.

References

External links

1960 births
Living people
People from Höör Municipality
Swedish dressage riders
Equestrians at the 2000 Summer Olympics
Equestrians at the 2004 Summer Olympics
Equestrians at the 2008 Summer Olympics
Olympic equestrians of Sweden
Swedish male equestrians
Sportspeople from Skåne County